The nuraghe Serbissi is a nuragic complex dating back to 18th-10th century BC. It is located in the municipality of Osini in Ogliastra, Italy.

The site is located on a limestone plateau between the towns of Osini and Gairo. The nuragic complex, built over a cave with two entrances, consists of a central tower of 6.3m high flanked by three smaller towers, around which are placed 8 circular huts. Access to the towers is through a small courtyard.

The complex was used from the Early Bronze Age to the Late Bronze Age.

External links

 Nuraghe Serbissi - Archeo Taccu 

Buildings and structures in Sardinia
Archaeological sites in Sardinia
Former populated places in Italy
Tourist attractions in Sardinia
Nuraghe